Arthur Antunes de Moraes e Castro (11 November 1899 – 20 December 1963), known as Laís, was a Brazilian footballer. He played in nine matches for the Brazil national football team from 1919 to 1922. He was also part of Brazil's squad for the 1919 South American Championship.

References

External links
 

1899 births
1963 deaths
Brazilian footballers
Brazil international footballers
Footballers from Rio de Janeiro (city)
Association football midfielders
Fluminense FC players
Brazilian football managers
Brazil national football team managers